"I'll Think of Something" is a song written by Bill Rice and Jerry Foster, which has been recorded by American country music singers Hank Williams Jr. and Mark Chesnutt. The song was also recorded by Loretta Lynn for her 1985 album Just a Woman.

Hank Williams, Jr. version
Hank Williams Jr. was the first artist to record the song. His version was a number seven country hit and the first single from his 1974 album Living Proof.

Chart performance

Mark Chesnutt version

Chesnutt's version is the second single released from his 1992 album Longnecks & Short Stories. It peaked at number one in both the United States and Canadian Country music charts.

An earlier fade marks the difference between the version released for radio airplay and 7-inch single release, and the longer album version.

Music video
The music video was directed by John Lloyd Miller.

Chart performance

Year-end charts

References

1974 songs
1974 singles
1992 singles
Hank Williams Jr. songs
Loretta Lynn songs
Mark Chesnutt songs
Songs written by Bill Rice
MGM Records singles
MCA Records singles
Song recordings produced by Mark Wright (record producer)
Music videos directed by John Lloyd Miller
Songs written by Jerry Foster